Linda Hanel (born 17 October 1961) is an Australian former champion swimmer. She competed in three events at the 1976 Summer Olympics in Montreal - the 100-metre Women's Butterfly (12th position), the 200-metre Women's Butterfly (12th position) and the 4x100-metre Women's Medley Relay (8th position). At the 1978 Commonwealth Games in Edmonton, Canada, Hanel set a Games record in her qualifying heat, with a time of 2:14.54. She went on to win a bronze medal in both the Women's 100-metre Butterfly and the 200-metre Butterfly. In her home state of Victoria, she held the record for the 200-metre open butterfly for nearly 26 years, with a time of 2:12.12.

Hanel won gold at the 1979 Spartaklad Games in Moscow in the 100-metre Butterfly event, crediting her friend, fellow Olympic swimmer Michelle Ford, for her success. She withdrew from the 1980 Moscow Olympics due to illness.

References

External links
 

1961 births
Living people
Australian female butterfly swimmers
Olympic swimmers of Australia
Swimmers at the 1976 Summer Olympics
Swimmers at the 1978 Commonwealth Games
Commonwealth Games medallists in swimming
Commonwealth Games bronze medallists for Australia
Place of birth missing (living people)
20th-century Australian women
21st-century Australian women
Medallists at the 1978 Commonwealth Games